Juan Francisco Manzano (1797–1854) was born a house slave in the Matanzas Province of Cuba during the colonial period. Manzano's father died before he was 15 and his only remaining family was his mother and two brothers. Manzano worked as a page through his whole life, which was a privileged job for a slave. He wrote two works of poetry and his autobiography while still enslaved. The Autobiography of a Slave is one of two only documented accounts of 19th-century Cuban slavery, the only existing narrative accounts of slavery in Spanish America. (The other is by Esteban Mesa Montejo.) Irish abolitionist Richard Robert Madden published his Poems by a slave in the island of Cuba in 1840. A second part to his autobiography was lost. He obtained his freedom in 1837 and later wrote a book of poems and a play Zafira. In 1844, Manzano was falsely accused of being involved in the conspiracy of La Escalera. After his release from prison in 1845 he did not publish again and died in 1854.

Early life
Manzano was born to Sofia del Pilar Manzano and Toribio de Castro in 1797. His married parents were both enslaved under Señora Beatriz de Justiz de Santa Ana, his mother being her chief handmaid. In his youth, Manzana  was not allowed to play with other black children from the plantations. He was treated like a criollo or Spanish child and had a comfortable life in comparison to other slaves in the important sugar region. However, the life of a house slave was isolating and left him ill-prepared for his next mistress. He was expected to be behind his mistress at all times and to cater to her wishes. His next mistress, María de la Concepción, Marquesa del Prado Ameno, was cruel and abusive. In 1836, at the age of 39, Manzano became a free man.

Hardships
Despite holding a position in the house Manzano faced many forms of physical and mental torture.  As a child, Manzano was forced to stay up till midnight sitting still on a stool. This was then followed with being forced up to hold a lamp well hanging from the back of a carriage. If the lamp went out, “the latter or the former would do a job on me and not as if I were a child.” 
Another common punishment for Manzano was to be vanquished to the men's infirmary. Once, in the infirmary, an assistant overseer entered ordered Manzano to be tied up similar to Jesus Christ during his crucifixion. He was then beaten to the point he lost so much blood he passed out.
Finally, Manzano was falsely convicted of stealing a chicken and was beaten for 9 days until he was proven innocent. During this time he was still expected to complete his normal task when he was not getting tormented.

Learning to write 
Manzano was a domestic slave with little power over his life, but he was taught to write by his master. His first mistress exposed him to the arts, and under her care, he memorized short plays, short poems known as décima, bits of opera, and other works of theater. Subsequently, with a master, Manzano was not allowed to use time that he could be working to recite by heart or write letters, but he practiced writing letters with the discarded notes of his master, first copying the script and then writing himself. Until he learned to read or write, Manzano was limited to remembering other's poetry. Writing allowed him to express his own viewpoints. He became a part of a group of Cuban reformists who, with a publicist and liberal writer named Domingo Del Monte, encouraged Manzano to write. The group took up a collection to buy Manzano's freedom. Manzano's poetry was edited by publishers who sought to create a cleaner version of the text, but in the process, the poems lost their authenticity.

In 1835, he began writing his life story at the request of Domingo del Monte, who bought Manzano's freedom in 1836. Del Monte wanted him to write a narrative of his life to help promote abolitionism among the enlightened middle class. In correspondence between Manzano and Del Monte, Manzano was initially hesitant to reveal details that he thought would not be well received by his benefactor. He gained greater self-confidence and certainty about his autobiography with time. He held back some material that he wanted to put in a later book, which never appeared.

Published works

Autobiography 
His work appears to be the first slave narrative published in Spanish America. Manzano says in his narrative that his parents' mistress possessed the power over life and death - and allowed him to be born. He writes, "remember when you read me that I am a slave and that the slave is a dead being in the eyes of his master,"  He had this master until he was 12 years old and she died. He remembers little of her death except standing in a line in his mistresses bed and crying afterward.

Manzano's biography makes reference to his body as a tool for his mistress's pleasure. His second mistress, Marquesa de Prado Ameno, exercised control by dressing him up. When dressed in fine clothes, he was on his mistress's good side. When dressed in rags, this symbolized her displeasure. His change of dress publicized symbolically him being stripped of his identity in front of others. Manzano's dignity was removed, due to his constant change of costume. He also claims that when he turned 14 his punishments grew worse and worse. His mistress would cage him up for 24 hours at a time without food or water. He would be punished several times a week: "" (This punishment was so common that not a week passed where I would not suffer from beatings twice or three times per week.)

Spanish edition 
Spanish colonial regime suppressed the history of marginalized social groups such as the African and the Chinese during the period the autobiography was written. During that time the Cuban sugar economy depended on slave labor for its economy. Even after the end of the Spanish rule in 1898, the book was unavailable to be published in Cuba  or the Spanish colonies. The autobiography was the property of Del Monte, passed to Del Monte's heirs and then passed to the national library in Havana where it was published in 1937.

English edition 
In the 19th century, Abolitionists published the literary works of slaves. In Manzano's case, his autobiography was published with the help of Del Monte and Madden. Because a Spanish version could not be published for some time, an English version translated by Richard Madden was published in England. In North America, slave narratives were translated and edited, partly for dramatic effect and would sometimes omit details. In Manzano's case, names, places and dates as well as instances of brutality were removed. Molloy points out that "on occasion the narratives contain so many of the editors views that there is little room for the testimony of the fugitive".

Zafira 
Manzano's play, Zafira, was published in 1842. It was a metaphor of colonialism and slavery in Cuba. Zafira takes place in 16th century Mauritania in North Africa. The play follows Zafira, an Arabian princess, who mourns the loss of her husband and dreads the wedding with the Turkish pirate, Barbarroja, who wants to rule the coast. Her son, Selim, returns in disguise to reclaim the throne. He allies himself with the slave Noemi to challenge the reign of Barbarroja. Zafira references the Haitian revolution of 1791, and the republic established there in 1804. The revolt led wealthy landowners to flee to Cuba bringing stories of the rebellion. French slaves were not allowed in Cuba for fear of another revolt. There was a presence of Spanish soldiers to prevent another uprising.

In the play, Selim possesses a mysterious letter. Zafira presents the letter to Barbarroja who responds to the letter with fear. This represents the Spanish and Cuban's fear of another uprising like the Haitian revolution. The themes are tyranny, exile, subjugation, slavery and rebellion in 19th-century Havana which indirectly challenged Spanish colonial rule. Manzano makes a subtle critique on personal and national sovereignty. His drama reflects the intellectual and political values of the enlightenment such as reason, order, justice and equality. Manzano may have found inspiration for Zafira from an earlier Spanish version entitled Tragedia. The Spanish hero in the original version was taken out in favor of the slave Noemi who represents Afro-Cuban slaves. In resistance writing, meaning is hidden in a symbol that appears harmless although it is full of complex double meanings. Manzano's play was about reaffirming African identity through the ideas of liberty and self-determination.

Contemporary views of his work 
Literary critic Jose Antonio Portoundo's article "Toward a new history of Cuba", written shortly after the triumph of the Cuban revolution, says: "there is no history among us that did not study the rise and fall of the dominant hegemonic class: the island bourgeoisie." He recommends to include the exploited class and their struggles into Cuban history. Manzano's autobiography gave rise to testimonial literature which discovered and uncovered the ""History of a people without a history."

References

William Luis, Literary Bondage: Slavery in Cuban Narraive (1991)

1797 births
1853 deaths
Cuban male writers
People who wrote slave narratives
People from Matanzas
Cuban slaves